Derro may refer to:

Derro, oilfield discovered in 1977 by SPC Samoco close to Deir ez Zor Syria
 Derro, a slang Australian term for a  dishevelled & unkempt person - synonymous with the American term wino. Abbreviated from Derelict
Derro, an evil subrace of underdark-dwelling dwarves in the Dungeons and Dragons role-playing game.

See also
 Dero (disambiguation)